The 2002 Swedish Touring Car Championship season was the 7th Swedish Touring Car Championship (STCC) season. >Nine racing weekends at four different circuits were held in total; each round comprising two races, with the exception of Round 4 at Falkenberg (4 races), making an eighteen-round competition in total. It was the last year with the Supertouring regulations, as 2003 saw the introduction of S2000 rules. STCC was one of the last national series to give up these set of rules. Roberto Colciago won his second consecutive title driving an Audi.

Teams and drivers

Race calendar and winners
All rounds were held in Sweden.

Championship results

Championship Standings

Driver's championship

Independent's championship

Manufacturer's Championship

References

External links
Official Results

Swedish Touring Car Championship seasons
Swedish Touring Car Championship
Swedish Touring Car Championship season